The Horseshoe Reef Lighthouse is a dilapidated lighthouse in Lake Erie between New York State and Canada near Buffalo, New York and at the head of the Niagara River, which empties Lake Erie into Lake Ontario.

The United Kingdom ceded one acre of territory surrounding Horseshoe Reef, an underwater hazard, to the United States on December 9, 1850. As such, the lighthouse played a minor role in the territorial evolution of the United States. On March 3, 1851 the US Congress allocated funding to build a lighthouse there, a contingency agreed upon for the transfer of the land. Construction was problematic but first light was finally achieved on September 1, 1856 using a Fresnel lens.

Operation ceased on August 1, 1919 or in 1920 and the lighthouse has been so far simply left to the elements and most of the house has rotted away.

The lighthouse is on the "Doomsday List" of the Lighthouse Digest magazine.

At present, the remains of the lighthouse serve as a habitat for cormorants.

External links
Horseshoe Reef Lighthouse
Horseshoe Reef Light

Lighthouses in New York (state)